Kakara may refer to:

Kakara, Indonesia, an island in Indonesia
Kakara pitha, a cake associated with Odisha, India
Kakarajima, an island in Japan
Kokora, a village in Estonia